Esternberg (Bavarian: Estanbere) is a municipality in the district of Schärding in the Austrian state of Upper Austria.

Geography
The 23 localities which belong to the municipality are Achleiten, Aug, Dietzendorf, Esternberg, Gersdorf, Hütt, Kösslarn, Kiesling, Lanzendorf, Pfarrhof, Pyrawang, Reisdorf, Riedlbach, Ringlholz, Schörgeneck, Schacher, Silbering, Unteresternberg, Urschendorf, Weeg, Wetzendorf, Winterhof and Zeilberg

References

Sauwald
Cities and towns in Schärding District